Glassmine Falls is an ephemeral waterfall in Buncombe County, North Carolina, on Glassmine Branch, near Barnardsville, NC. It is located below the Blue Ridge Parkway around milepost 362.

Geology
When it flows, the falls slides down the rock face of Blackstock Knob Mountain down to the North Fork Swannanoa River. The flow is not constant and can sometimes nearly dry up completely. It is most visible after heavy rains, which can be at any time during the year. A sign at the overlook for the falls claims that the falls is over 800 ft (247m) high, although the actual height is probably much less.

History
At the base of the falls is the old Abernathy Mine, a mica mine.  The miners referred to the mineral they mined as "glass", which is how the falls got its name.

Visiting The Falls
Access to the falls is restricted to a viewing platform at milemarker 361.2 on the Blue Ridge Parkway.  The falls is directly in the City of Asheville's watershed, so direct access to the falls is strictly prohibited.

Nearby Falls
Walker Falls
Douglas Falls
Mitchell Falls
Setrock Creek Falls
Roaring Fork Falls
Whiteoak Creek Falls

External links 
North Carolina Waterfalls Waterfalls on the Blue Ridge Parkway

Protected areas of Buncombe County, North Carolina
Waterfalls of North Carolina
Landforms of Buncombe County, North Carolina